Dekoda Watson (born March 3, 1988) is a former American football linebacker. He was drafted by the Tampa Bay Buccaneers in the seventh round of the 2010 NFL Draft. He played college football at Florida State.

Early years
Watson attended South Aiken High School in Aiken, South Carolina, where he was a letterman in football and track. In high school football, he recorded 123 tackles, 32 tackles for loss and 11 sacks as a senior, earning him all-state honors by SCVarsity.com and all-southern team by the Orlando Sentinel. In his junior season, he registered 102 tackles, 29 tackles for loss and 18 sacks from the defensive end position. Watson was named Defensive MVP after recording nine tackles and a sack for the South Carolina team in the annual North Carolina–South Carolina Shrine Bowl.

In track & field, Watson was an standout athlete as sprinter/jumper. At the 2006 Region 4-4A, he captured two state titles, winning the triple jump with a leap of 42 ft 10 in (13.10 m), and running the lead leg on the South Aiken 4 × 100 m relay, helping them win the event with a time of 42.59 seconds. In addition, he also earned a second-place finish in the 100-meter dash, with a PR time of 11.07 seconds.

Considered a three-star recruit by Rivals.com, Watson was listed as the No. 25 outside linebacker in the nation. He chose Florida State over South Carolina, Tennessee, and Virginia Tech.

College career
In his initial year at Florida State, Watson played in 12 games and earned one starting assignment at the weakside linebacker position against Boston College, stepping in for the injured Geno Hayes. He totaled 23 tackles to finish second on the team among first year players (second to Myron Rolle) in total tackles, and earned All-ACC Freshman Team honors by The Sporting News.

As a sophomore, Watson started all 12 games during the regular season at the strong side linebacker position and ranked fifth on the team with a single-season career-high 50 tackles. In his junior year, he ranked fourth among Seminoles defenders with 46 tackles.

Professional career

Tampa Bay Buccaneers
Watson was drafted by the Tampa Bay Buccaneers in the seventh round of the 2010 NFL Draft. Watson was signed to a four-year contract on June 18, 2010.

Jacksonville Jaguars
Watson signed with the Jacksonville Jaguars on March 12, 2014. He was waived on November 11, 2014.

Dallas Cowboys
Watson signed with the Dallas Cowboys on November 13, 2014, just four days after playing against them as a member of the Jacksonville Jaguars. He was released on May 8, 2015.

New England Patriots
Watson signed with the New England Patriots on May 12, 2015. On August 31, 2015, the Patriots released Watson.

On September 16, 2015, the Patriots re-signed Watson. They released him again on September 30, 2015.

Watson was once again signed by the Patriots on December 29, 2015.

Denver Broncos
On May 16, 2016, Watson signed with the Denver Broncos.

San Francisco 49ers
On March 17, 2017, Watson signed a three-year deal worth $6 million with the San Francisco 49ers.

On September 8, 2018, Watson was placed on injured reserve with a hamstring injury. He was activated off injured reserve to the active roster on November 1, 2018. On December 5, 2018, Watson was placed on injured reserve for the second time in a year with a calf injury.

Denver Broncos (second stint)
On April 27, 2019, the 49ers traded Watson, along with a sixth round draft pick, to the Denver Broncos in exchange for a fifth round pick. He was released on August 26, 2019.

Seattle Seahawks
On October 30, 2019, Watson was signed by the Seattle Seahawks, but was released two days later. On December 18, 2019, Watson was signed for the second time by the Seattle Seahawks.

References

External links
 Jacksonville Jaguars profile 

1988 births
Living people
Sportspeople from Aiken, South Carolina
Players of American football from South Carolina
American football linebackers
Florida State Seminoles football players
Tampa Bay Buccaneers players
Jacksonville Jaguars players
Dallas Cowboys players
New England Patriots players
Denver Broncos players
San Francisco 49ers players
Seattle Seahawks players
African-American players of American football
21st-century African-American sportspeople
20th-century African-American people